Karagaykul (Qarağaykül) is a rural locality (a village) in Oktyabrsky Selsoviet, Blagoveshchensky District, Bashkortostan, Russia. The population was 111 as of 2010. There are 2 streets.

Geography 
Karagaykul is located 74 km northeast of Blagoveshchensk (the district's administrative centre) by road. Mukhametdinovo is the nearest rural locality.

References 

Rural localities in Blagoveshchensky District